"My Heart Is a Flower" is a song by avant-garde band King Missile. It was the only single from the band's 1991 album The Way to Salvation.

Content
In "My Heart Is a Flower," a pop rock track with elements of psychedelic rock, frontman John S. Hall repeatedly sings the titular phrase, recites a short monologue expanding on the heart-as-flower metaphor, then returns to singing the titular phrase as the music crescendoes.

In an interview circa 1992, Hall explained his inspiration for the song as follows:

Music video
The video for "My Heart Is a Flower" was directed by Phil Morrison. During the parts of the video that accompany the sung sections of the song, the band performs in a large, colorful garden, with multi-instrumentalist Chris Xefos often playing in a bear costume. During the part of the video that accompanies the spoken section, Hall plays chutes and ladders in a dimly lit room with a woman played by Juliana Hatfield. The woman flosses her teeth before narrowly avoiding a kiss from Hall.

References

King Missile songs
Experimental rock songs
1991 singles
Songs written by John S. Hall
Songs written by Dave Rick